Cistogaster   is a genus of tachinid flies in the family Tachinidae. Known hosts are Hemiptera of the genus Aelia sp. (family Pentatomidae).

Species
C. acuta (Zimin, 1966)
C. agata (Zimin, 1966)
C. dominica Curran, 1927
C. globosa (Fabricius, 1775)
C. insularis Williston, 1896
C. mesnili (Zimin, 1966)
C. punctatus Robineau-Desvoidy, 1863
C. sinuata (Zimin, 1966)

External links

Phasiinae
Tachinidae genera
Taxa named by Pierre André Latreille
Diptera of Europe
Diptera of Asia
Diptera of North America